Tvøroyrar Bóltfelag is a Faroese football club from Tvøroyri, currently playing in the Betrideildin, the top tier of Faroese football. TB Tvøroyri is the oldest football club in the Faroe Islands, and also one of the oldest in the Danish Realm, in which the Faroe Islands are a self-governing country. 

After the end of the 2016 season, it was decided on 15 December 2016 that the three clubs of the island Suðuroy, which are TB Tvøroyri, FC Suðuroy and Royn Hvalba would merge into a new club for the 2017 season. The merger will not be complete until 2018 and the name will be all three names together for the 2017 season: TB/FC Suðuroy/Royn. The three clubs have not been dissolved yet, they continue separately for the children's and women's teams. In 2017 it will only be the men's teams which will play for the new cooperation. In Faroese the new team is referred to as Suðuroyarliðið (the Suðuroy-team). The first head coach for the Suðuroy-team is the Scottish manager Maurice Ross. After two years the three clubs ended the co-operation and TB Tvøroyri continued to play with their licence which was for the Faroese Premier League.
In 2020 TB became a member of the Club of Pioneers, a network of oldest football clubs.

Honours
Faroe Islands Premier League: 7
 1943, 1949, 1951, 1976, 1977, 1980, 1987
Faroe Islands Cup: 5
 1956, 1958, 1960, 1961, 1977
1. deild: 4
 1948, 2001, 2004, 2014

The squad 

As of 7 May 2020.

The home fields in Sevmýri and við Stórá

TB Tvøroyri used to play their home matches on Sevmýri Stadium, which is located in the eastern part of the town, near Froðba. But in 2011, the football field there was in such a bad shape, that the Faroe Islands Football Association could not allow any adult teams to play there. TB Tvøroyri therefore arranged with one of the neighbour villages, Hvalba, that they would play their matches there in 2011. On 17 November 2011, they started to build a new football stadium in Trongisvágur, just west of the sports hall, the place is called við Stórá (which means By Grand River). They worked very hard to get the new home field ready for the club's 120 years anniversary on 13 May 2012 and they made it. The new football field was ready in mid April, but it was not recognized for matches in the men's best division for the match against B36 Tórshavn as they had hoped for, the reason for this was that there were no seats yet, and the minimum demand for seats is 300. TB therefore played their home match against B36 Tórshavn in Vágur on 15 April 2012. They worked hard in order to get at least 300 seats around the football field, and that work finished on the Faroese flagday on 25 April 2012. Two days later on 27 April 2012, TB's new football field við Stórá was finally approved for matches in the men's best division. The football field officially opened on 29 April 2012. There was an opening ceremony just before TB played against ÍF Fuglafjørður, at the ceremony there were speeches by Andre Dalfoss, president of TB Tvøroyri and by Jens Johannesen, Chairman of Cultural Affairs of Tvøroyri Municipality and there was music by Tvøroyri Brass Band (Tvøroyrar Hornorkestur). Just a few minutes before the match started one of the former players of TB Tvøroyri Mr. Kristian Olsen, who at this time was 88 years old, got the honour to kick the first ball. TB Tvøroyri won this first match 1–0, the goal was scored by the Serbian player Dmitrije Janković.

Notable former players
Former TB-players who have played for the Faroe Islands national football team:
  Gilli Sørensen (plays on the national team and in the Norwegian Tippeliga)
  Óli Johannesen (second most capped player of the Faroese national team)
  Patrik Johannesen (plays on the national team)

Managers

 Sverre Midjord (1968–1971)
 Jørgen Marius Kølleskov (1972)
 Sigmund Nolsøe (1983)
 Henrik Thomsen (1983)
 Benadikt Valdisson (1984)
 John Rødgaard (1985)
 Egill Steintórsson (1986–87)
 Svend Petersen (1988)
 Hans Pauli Holm (April 1989 – June 89)
 Per Henning Jensen (1990)
 Finn Røntved (1991–92)
 Dánjal Hofgaard (1993)
 Jacek Burkhardt (1994)
 Sigvald Steinkross (Oct 1995)
 Frank Skytte (March 1995 – Sept 95)
 Egill Steintórsson (Aug 1998 – Oct 98)
 Egill Steintórsson (March 1999 – April 99)
 Lynge Nielsen (March 2000 – April 00)
 Per Mikkelsen (March 2001 – April 01)
 Håkon Winther (April 2001 – June 01)
 Milan Cimburović (Aug 2001 – Sept 01)
 Zoran Mančić (March 2002 – May 02)
 Lynge Nielsen (June 2002 – Sept 02)
 Jón Johannesen (Sept 2002 – Oct 02)
 Jón Johannesen (2004)
  Milan Milanović (2005)
 Oddbjørn Joensen (Jan 1, 2006 – Dec 31, 2006)
 Jan Nielsen (Jan 2007 – April 13, 2007)
 Milan Cimburović (April 13, 2007 – July 07)
 Krzysztof Popczyński (Aug 1, 2007 – July 5, 2008)
 Jón Johannesen (July 31, 2008–??)
 Pól Fríðrikur Joensen (2009)
 Jón Johannesen (Jan 1, 2010 – Dec 31, 2011)
 Milan Kuljić (Jan 1, 2012 – Nov 30, 2012)
 Hans Fróði Hansen (Jan 1, 2013 – July 23, 2013)
 Bill McLeod Jacobsen (caretaker) (July 24, 2013 – Aug 11, 2013)
 Páll Guðlaugsson (Aug 12, 2013 – Oct 3, 2015)
 Robert F. Roelofsen (Oct 3, 2015 – Jun 1, 2016)
  Sigfríður Clementsen (Jun 6, 2016 – 31 Oct, 2016)
  Michael Lundsgaard Winter (January 2020 – May 2021 )
  Lars Heiliger (May 2021 - September 2021 )
  Helen Lorraine Nkwocha (September 2021 - )

Chairmen

 Reidar Simonsen (2020 –)
 Henrik Thomsen (2017 –2020)
 Poul Erik Smedemark (Nov 2016 –2017
 Niels Pauli Eystberg (Feb 2016 — Nov 2016)
 Fróði Olsen (March 2015 – Feb 2016)
 Egil Olsen (Nov 2014 – March 2015)
 Palli Eysturberg (Nov 2013 – Nov 2014)
 André Dalfoss (Oct 2009 – Nov 2013)
 Jóhan Petur Olgarsson (20??–Oct 09)

References

 FaroeSoccer.com
 footballzz.co.uk

External links

 TB Tvøroyri's official Official website
 Við Stórá Stadion – Nordic Stadiums

Football clubs in the Faroe Islands
Association football clubs established in 1892
1892 establishments in the Faroe Islands